The New Zealand Listener is a weekly New Zealand magazine that covers the political, cultural and literary life of New Zealand by featuring a variety of topics, including current events, politics, social issues, health, technology, arts, food, culture and entertainment. The Bauer Media Group closed The Listener in April 2020 as a result of the COVID-19 pandemic in New Zealand. In June 2020, Mercury Capital acquired the magazine as part of its purchase of Bauer Media's former Australia and New Zealand assets, which were rebranded as Are Media.

History

The Listener was first published in June 1939 as a weekly broadcasting guide for radio listeners, and the first issue was distributed free to 380,000 households. First edited by Oliver Duff then from June 1949  M. H. Holcroft, it originally had a monopoly on the publication of upcoming television and radio programmes. In the 1980s it lost that monopoly, but despite the increase in competition since that time, it was still one of the top selling magazines in the country. It was privatised in 1990 and was published by Bauer Media Group until the magazine's closure in early 2020.

Pamela Stirling was the editor since 2004, and by 2018 readership was 197,000 with a circulation of 45,262.

From 2004 to 2009, the Listener produced an annual New Zealand Listener Power List of the 50 most powerful people in New Zealand. It also published the Best 100 Books, Best 50 Kids Books, and Best Cookbooks, every November/December.

Notable writers to have had their work published in the Listener include James K. Baxter, Janet Frame and Maurice Shadbolt.

Closure and restart, 2020 

On 2 April 2020, the Bauer Media Group announced the closing of many of its New Zealand and Australian publications, including The Listener, due to the continued loss of advertising revenue, hastened by the COVID-19 pandemic. Prior to that, the weekly current affairs printed magazine was billed as "New Zealand's best-selling current affairs magazine with a per capita circulation higher than Time, the New Yorker and Spectator".

On 17 June 2020, Australian investment company Mercury Capital purchased The Listener as part of its acquisition of Bauer Media's Australia and New Zealand assets. On 17 July, Mercury Capital announced that it would resume publishing The Listener and other former Bauer publications. In late September 2020, Mercury Capital rebranded Bauer Media as Are Media, which took over publication of The Listener. Publication of The Listener resumed with the issue of 10 October 2020.

Editors 

 Oliver Duff (1939–1949) 
M. H. Holcroft (1949–1967; 1972–1973)
Alexander McLeod (1967–1972)
Ian Cross (1973–1977)
Tony Reid (1977–1980)
Peter Stewart (1980–1983; 1987–1989)
David Beatson (1984–1989)
Geoff Baylis (1989–1993 Editor-in-chief, CEO)
Terry Snow (1991–1995)
Jenny Wheeler (1995–1997)
Paul Little (1997–1998)
Finlay Macdonald (1998–2003)
 Pamela Stirling (2004–2021)
 Karyn Scherer (2021–current)

Regular writers/journalists 
 Diana Wichtel
Donna Chisholm
 Bill Ralston
 Nicky Pellegrino
Sally Blundell
Paul Thomas (writer)
Jane Clifton
Russell Baillie, Books & Culture Editor
Fiona Rae
 Michael Cooper
 Clare de Lore 
 Peter Griffin
Marc Wilson, psychology columnist
Paul Thomas, sports columnist
Joanne Black
Jennifer Bowden
Greg Dixon
Michele Hewitson
Mark Broatch
 Rose McIver
Andrew Anthony
Sam Neill
Louise Chunn
Cathrin Schaer 
Bernard Lagan

Regular cartoonists/illustrators/photographers
Chris Slane (cartoonist)
Anthony Ellison (cartoonist)
Andrew Tristram (cartoonist)
Jane Ussher (photographer)
Ken Downie (photographer)
Simon Young (photographer)
Hagen Hopkins (photographer)

See also

 Media in New Zealand
 List of print media in New Zealand

References

External links
 (archived)

1939 establishments in New Zealand
2020 disestablishments in New Zealand
Are Media
Literary magazines published in New Zealand
Magazines established in 1939
Magazines disestablished in 2020
Mass media in Auckland
News magazines published in New Zealand
Weekly magazines published in New Zealand